CSBF may refer to:
 Canadian Stage Band Festival, now MusicFest Canada
 Central Sheep Breeding Farm, in Hisar, Haryana, India
 Columbia Scientific Balloon Facility, a NASA facility responsible for providing support for unmanned, high altitude balloons
 Commission for the Supervision of Banking and Finance, Madagascar